Stan Harrison (born 1953) is an American  saxophonist.

Stan or Stanley Harrison may also refer to:

Stan Harrison (footballer, born 1940) (1940–2000), Australian rules footballer for Geelong
Stan Harrison (footballer, born 1944), Australian rules footballer for Carlton